Neolebias is a genus of small distichodontid freshwater fishes found in Africa.

Species

There currently 11 recognized species:

 Neolebias ansorgii Boulenger, 1912
 Neolebias axelrodi Poll & J. P. Gosse, 1963
 Neolebias gossei (Poll & J. G. Lambert, 1964)
 Neolebias gracilis Matthes, 1964
 Neolebias kerguennae Daget, 1980
 Neolebias lozii Winemiller & Kelso-Winemiller, 1993 (banded neolebias)
 Neolebias philippei Poll & J. P. Gosse, 1963
 Neolebias powelli Teugels & T. R. Roberts, 1990
 Neolebias trewavasae Poll & J. P. Gosse, 1963
 Neolebias trilineatus Boulenger, 1899 (three-line tetra)
 Neolebias unifasciatus Steindachner, 1894

References

Taxa named by Franz Steindachner
Distichodontidae
Fish of Africa